Colonel Chabert may refer to:

 Colonel Chabert (novel), an 1832 novella by French novelist and playwright Honoré de Balzac
 Colonel Chabert (1920 film), a silent German film
 Colonel Chabert (1943 film), a film directed by René Le Hénaff
 Colonel Chabert (1994 film), a film directed by Yves Angelo
Oberst Chabert, an opera composed by Hermann Wolfgang von Waltershausen (1882 - 1954)